The black-crowned fulvetta (Schoeniparus klossi) is a bird species in the family Pellorneidae. Until recently it was considered a sub-species of the rufous-winged fulvetta. It is endemic to Vietnam.

References

External links
 BirdLife International (2011) Species factsheet: Alcippe klossi. Downloaded from https://www.webcitation.org/5QE8rvIqH?url=http://www.birdlife.org/ on 1 December 2011.

black-crowned fulvetta
Endemic birds of Vietnam
black-crowned fulvetta
black-crowned fulvetta